Rachel Mary Roxburgh  (21 September 1915 – 13 April 1991) was an Australian artist, potter, colonial historian and environmental activist.

Early life and education 
Roxburgh was born in Point Piper, New South Wales on 21 September 1915. She attended Ascham School and the East Sydney Technical College, where she received Grade A (over 83%) for both the Introductory Art Course in 1932 and the Intermediate Course in 1933. She then attended the Adelaide Perry Art School in Sydney.

Awards and legacy 
Roxburgh received a British Empire Medal in 1979 for services to the community.

A 1939 portrait of Roxburgh by Adelaide Perry is held in the National Portrait Gallery of Australia.

The Art Gallery of New South Wales holds 21 boxes of papers relating to Roxburgh's work as a painter and potter, including extensive personal correspondence from 1945 to 1990, diaries, sketchbooks, newspaper cuttings and exhibition catalogues.

One folio package and 19 boxes of her extensive research into the history of colonial buildings about which she wrote, correspondence and family papers all gathered between 1960 and 1986 are held by the National Library of Australia.

The National Trust held a Retrospective Exhibition of her paintings, pottery, books, photographs and memorabilia at Cooma Cottage, Yass and Riversdale, Goulburn in May–June 1993.

Works

Books 
 History of Riversdale, Goulburn, The National Trust of Australia New South Wales, 1970
 Early Colonial Houses of New South Wales, Ure Smith, 1974, 
 Colonial Farm Buildings of New South Wales, Rigby, 1978, 
 Berrima Court House, Berrima Court House Trust, 1981, 
 Throsby Park: An account of the Throsby Family in Australia 1802-1840, NSW National Parks & Wildlife Service, 1989

Articles 
 "Thomas Potter Macqueen of Segenhoe", Royal Historical Society Journal, vol. 58, pt. 3 September 1972

Death 
Roxburgh died on 13 April 1991 at Castle Hill, New South Wales.

References

External links 

 Rachel Roxburgh, 1939 portrait by Adelaide Perry in the National Portrait Gallery

1915 births
1991 deaths
People educated at Ascham School
20th-century Australian women artists
20th-century Australian artists
Australian potters
20th-century Australian historians